Elisabeth Schmierer (born in 1955) is a German musicologist. She researches and teaches at the Folkwang University of the Arts in Essen.

Career 
Born in Tübingen, Schmierer graduated from high school in Freudenstadt and initially studied school music at the State University of Music and Performing Arts Stuttgart. This was followed by studies in musicology, history and art history at the University of Kiel, where she also received her doctorate in 1989. Her habilitation was completed at the Technische Universität Berlin. Seit 2000 lehrt sie in Essen. She is married to Matthias Brzoska.

Publications 
 Die Orchesterlieder Gustav Mahlers. Kassel 1991 (Dissertation)
 Die Tragédies lyriques Niccolò Piccinnis. Zur Synthese französischer und italienischer Oper im späten 18. Jahrhundert,  1999 (Habilitationsschrift)
 Kleine Geschichte der Oper. Stuttgart 2001. 
 Komponisten-Porträts Stuttgart: Reclam 2003, 2010
 Geschichte des Liedes. Laaber-Verl. 2007. 2nd continuous edition 2016. 
 Geschichte des Konzerts. Laaber-Verl. 2015. 
 Editor: Töne – Farben – Formen. Über Musik und die Bildenden Künste, Festschrift für Elmar Budde zum 60. Geburtstag (together with Susanne Fontaine, Werner Grünzweig und Matthias Brzoska). Laaber Verl. 1995. 2. Auflage 1998
 Editor: Lexikon der Oper. Komponisten – Werke – Interpreten – Sachbegriffe. Laaber Verl. 2002.
 Editor: Lexikon der Musik in der Renaissance (2009)

References 

20th-century German musicologists
Women musicologists
21st-century German musicologists
1955 births
Living people
People from Tübingen